Dave Reid may refer to:

Dave Reid (ice hockey, born 1934), Canadian ice hockey player
Dave Reid (ice hockey, born 1964), Canadian ice hockey player

See also
David Reid (disambiguation)
David Reed (disambiguation)
David Read (disambiguation)